Guy Perry is an American actor.

Perry is best known for films and television series such as The New Daughter, Zoolander, The Shield, Nip/Tuck and True Blood.

Perry portrayed the elf in the Virgin Mobile holiday ad campaign 12 Days of Chrismahanukwanzakah.

Perry also acted in the viral music video "Synthesizer" by Electric Six.

References

External links

American male film actors
American male musical theatre actors
American male television actors
American male voice actors
Living people
Los Angeles County High School for the Arts alumni
Place of birth missing (living people)
Year of birth missing (living people)